These are the results of the athletics competition at the 2003 Afro-Asian Games which took place from October 28 to October 30, 2003 in Hyderabad, India.

Men's results

100 meters
October 30Wind: -0.6 m/s

200 meters
October 29Wind: +0.8 m/s

400 meters
October 28

800 meters
October 30

1500 meters
October 29

5000 meters
October 28

10,000 meters
October 30

110 meters hurdles
October 30Wind: -2.2 m/s

400 meters hurdles
October 28

3000 meters steeplechase
October 29

4 × 100 meters relay
October 29

4 × 400 meters relay
October 30

10,000 meters walk
October 30

High jump
October 30

Pole vault
October 28

Long jump
October 29

Triple jump
October 30

Shot put
October 30

Discus throw
October 29

Hammer throw
October 30

Javelin throw
October 29

Women's results

100 meters
October 30Wind: -1.6 m/s

200 meters
October 29Wind: -0.8 m/s

400 meters
October 28

800 meters
October 30

1500 meters
October 28

5000 meters
October 30

10,000 meters
October 29

100 meters hurdles
October 29Wind: -1.0 m/s

400 meters hurdles
October 30

4 × 100 meters relay
October 29

4 × 400 meters relay
October 30

10,000 meters walk
October 30

High jump
October 28

Pole vault
October 29

Long jump
October 29

Triple jump
October 28

Shot put
October 30

Discus throw
October 30

Hammer throw
October 28

Javelin throw
October 28

Heptathlon
October 28–29

References
Results
Results

Afro-Asian Games
2003
2003 Afro-Asian Games